This is a list of solar telescopes built in various countries around the world. A solar telescope is a specialized telescope that is used to observe the Sun.

This list contains ground-based professional observatory telescopes at optical wavelengths in chronological order. Solar telescopes often have multiple focal lengths, and use a various combination of mirrors such as coelostats, lenses, and tubes for instruments including spectrographs, cameras, or coronagraphs. There are many types of instruments that have been designed to observe Earth's Sun, for example, in the 20th century solar towers were common.

Ground telescopes

Optical telescopes

Telescopes for the Sun have existed for hundreds of years, this list is not complete and only goes back to 1900.

Potential future optical telescopes

Radio telescopes

Other types of solar telescopes
There are much smaller commercial and/or amateur telescopes such as Coronado Filters from founder and designer David Lunt, bought by Meade Instruments in 2004 and sells SolarMax solar telescopes up to 8 cm

Most solar observatories observe optically at visible, UV, and near infrared wavelengths, but other things can be observed.

CERN Axion Solar Telescope (CAST), looks for solar axions from the early 2000s onwards
Multi-spectral solar telescope array (MSSTA), a rocket launched payload of UV telescopes in the 1990s 
Leoncito Astronomical Complex, has a submillimeter wavelength solar telescope.
Owens Valley Solar Array, for solar radio observation

Further reading
BBSO List of large solar telescopes by aperture

See also 
 Solar tower (astronomy)
 List of heliophysics missions
 Lists of telescopes

References 

Refracting telescopes